Calpionella is an extinct genus of calpionellid, a group of single celled eukaryotes. Their fossils are found in rocks of Upper Jurassic to Lower Cretaceous age.

Etymology 
The name is derived from the Greek "κάλπις", meaning "water jug".

Biostratigraphic significance 
The first occurrence of the species Calpionella alpina marks the beginning of the Berriasian and thus Cretaceous.

Distribution 
Fossils of the genus have been found in:
Jurassic
 Guasasa Formation, Cuba
 Stramberk Formation, Czech Republic
Cretaceous
 Puke, Albania
 Argiles de Ghriss Formation, Algeria
 Steinmühl Formation, Austria
 Abenaki Formation, Nova Scotia, Canada
 Guasasa Formation, Cuba
 Lake Rożnów, Poland
 Lapos Formation, Romania
 Miravetes and Tollo Formations, Spain

References 

Alveolata genera
Prehistoric SAR supergroup genera
Index fossils
Late Jurassic first appearances
 
Early Cretaceous extinctions
Jurassic Cuba
Cretaceous Cuba
Fossils of Cuba
Fossils of the Czech Republic
Fossils of Albania
Fossils of Algeria
Cretaceous Austria
Fossils of Austria
Cretaceous Nova Scotia
Fossils of Canada
Fossils of Poland
Cretaceous Romania
Fossils of Romania
Cretaceous Spain
Fossils of Spain
Fossil taxa described in 1902